Steve Zaiser is a North Dakota Democratic-NPL Party member of the North Dakota House of Representatives, representing the 21st district since 2003.

Education
Steve Zaiser received his education from the following institutions:
BA, American Studies Organizational Development, Moorhead State University, 1977

Political Experience
Steve Zaiser has had the following political experience:
Representative, North Dakota State House, 2002–present
Candidate, North Dakota House of Representatives, District 21, 2010
Chair, Democratic-NPL, District 21, 1998-2000
Vice-Chair, Democratic-NPL, 1997

Current Legislative Committees
Steve Zaiser has been a member of the following committees:
Finance and Taxation, Member
Political Subdivisions, Member

Caucuses/Non-Legislative Committees
Steve Zaiser has been a member of the following committees:
Regional Coordinator, White House Conference on Families, 1976-1980
Devils Lake CBD Steering Committee
Fargo-Moorhead Mosquito Abatement Committee
Fargo-Moorhead Pedestrian Committee

Professional Experience
Steve Zaiser has had the following professional experience:
Part-time Job Developer, Productive Alternatives, 2001–present
Executive Director, River Keepers 1990-1997
Community Development Planner, F-M Council of Governments, 1987-1988
Manager, Devils Lake Steam Heat Authority, 1983-1987
Planning Director, City of Devils Lake, 1977-1982

References

External links
North Dakota Legislative Assembly - Representative Steve Zaiser official ND Senate website
Project Vote Smart - Representative Steve Zaiser (ND) profile
Follow the Money - Steve Zaiser
2006 2002 campaign contributions
North Dakota Democratic-NPL Party - Representative Steve Zaiser profile

Minnesota State University Moorhead alumni
1951 births
Living people
People from Montevideo, Minnesota
Politicians from Fargo, North Dakota
21st-century American politicians
Democratic Party members of the North Dakota House of Representatives